William Bruce Meeks Jr. (aka William Bruce Meeks II; March 2, 1921 – September 8, 1999) was an American producer, composer and arranger of radio jingles and founder of PAMS in Dallas; which, according to Billboard in 1972, was the largest jingles firm in the world.

Meeks was also a keen woodwind, flute, and saxophone player. In addition, he was an expert in music physics.

Biography
He was born on March 2, 1921, in Terrell, Texas. He graduated from Dallas' Sunset High School and the University of North Texas College of Music, and was an Army-Air Force World War 2 veteran.

Bill worked in radio, both as a broadcaster and also selling advertising. He would often create jingles for some of the clients he sold time to. Eventually he decided to devote all his time to advertising, and in 1951 he started his own company called "PAMS Advertising Agency, Inc".

For several years PAMS created commercials and sold air time for a variety of clients and very few station jingles were made. But in the mid-1950s, the radio ID side of the business took off, and previously made individual cuts were assembled into packages that were then syndicated to stations all over America.

After the success of the first few PAMS jingle series, the company's focus slowly shifted to providing ID's to the ever growing number of top-40 radio stations. By the end of 1964, PAMS' primary business had become station jingles, and the name of the company was shortened to PAMS, Inc.

Not all of Meeks's ideas worked and not all his ventures were financially successful, but many of them touched the lives of millions of radio listeners, even though most outside of the industry don't know his name. Bill ran PAMS for 27 years before suspending operations in 1978, PAMS jingles were later produced by Ken R. Deutsch and Ben Freedman under the CPMG/PAMS moniker. In 1990, following court hearings, the original PAMS corporation, including all its copyrights, was purchased by JAM Creative Productions in Dallas.

Family 
Parents
William Bruce Meeks Jr. was born to the marriage of William Bosse Meeks (1893–1981) and Ola Lema Nations (1892–1987).  He had a brother – Charles Holten Meeks (b. September 7, 1922; d. July 27, 1976) – born to the same marriage.

William Bruce Meeks Jr. married Marjorie Ann Staggs (b. December 18, 1924, in Abbeville, Louisiana; d. June 7, 2011, in Dallas, Texas) on August 11, 1943, and together, they had three children: Dennis Bruce Meeks (a/k/a Dennis Bruce Meeks, Sr.) (b. September 13, 1945; d. November 25, 2014 in Myrtle Beach, South Carolina), Anita Louise Meeks, and Jeanne Marie Meeks (b. April 9, 1958; d. August 7, 1994, in Dallas, Texas).  Bill Meeks died of cancer on September 8, 1999, and was survived by grandchildren Devon, Brandon, Megan, Dennis, Casey, Todd; and, his great-grandchildren Christopher, Gage, Kaylee, Gavin, Lillie, Arabella, and Mitchell.

References

External links
 PAMS story
 Photos from PAMS
 Further reading on Meeks and PAMS

Jingle writers
American male composers
1999 deaths
1921 births
American radio producers
20th-century American composers
People from Terrell, Texas
20th-century American male musicians